Trena Mary Cox (1895–1980) was an English stained glass artist.  

She was born Emma Trina Cox on 3 March 1895, in the Lower Bebington Urban District (i.e. not Bebbington), on the Wirral Peninsula and grew up around Birkenhead. She trained at the Laird School of Art. In 1924 she moved to Chester and set up her studio in Victoria Road Chester, Cheshire, either adjacent to, or within, the Kaleyard works of Williams, Gamon & Co., with whom she remained associated until the Second World War. In about 1945, Trena Cox moved to 96 Watergate Street, Chester, which remained her home and, at least later, her studio, until she retired in 1972 (at the age of 77) and died, on 11 February 1980 (not in 1977, as frequently quoted). Most of her works are in churches in the old counties of Cheshire and Lancashire. She was a fellow of the British Society of Master Glass Painters. The authors of the Buildings of England series comment that "her windows are usually small, her figures modest, often with small-scale detail in the quarries" (small pieces of square or diamond-shaped glass set diagonally).

Until the publication of Jones (2012), there was very little coherent information available about the life of Trena Cox and errors in some earlier references, concerning, for example, the year of her death, have unfortunately been perpetuated by later authors.

Selected works

Notes

References
Citations

Sources
 
 
 
 
 

1895 births
1980 deaths
20th-century English women artists
British stained glass artists and manufacturers